Kenneth James Veysey (born 8 June 1967) is an English former professional football goalkeeper and is currently goalkeeping coach at Torquay United. He was born in Hackney, London.

In June 2007, Veysey again became Torquay United's goalkeeping coach.

References

1967 births
Living people
English footballers
Footballers from the London Borough of Hackney
Arsenal F.C. players
Torquay United F.C. players
Oxford United F.C. players
Reading F.C. players
Exeter City F.C. players
Plymouth Argyle F.C. players
Taunton Town F.C. players
Dawlish United F.C. players
Torquay United F.C. non-playing staff
Association football goalkeepers
Association football goalkeeping coaches